Churchbridge is a civil parish in the South Staffordshire District of Staffordshire, England. It is situated on the A34 between Cannock and Great Wyrley.

References

External links
 Francis Frith archive - older maps of the area

Villages in Staffordshire